Claudio Nicolás Cardozo Lobarinas (born April 24, 1983) is a Uruguayan football midfielder, who currently plays for Real España.

Club career

Marathon 
Cardozo made his competitive debut for Marathon in CONCACAF Champions League preliminary round scoring his first brace for the club, as he scored twice in a 0–3 win over Tauro F.C. on 28 July 2010
. He made his debut in the Liga Nacional de Fútbol de Honduras for El Monstruo Verde on 11 August, and scored his first goal on 29 August 2010 against Vida.

Hunan Billows 
China League One club Hunan Billows announced that they had signed Cardozo from Marathón on 8 February 2012.

References 

1983 births
Living people
Uruguayan footballers
Uruguayan expatriate footballers
C.D. Marathón players
C.D.S. Vida players
Deportivo Marquense players
12 de Octubre Football Club players
Liverpool F.C. (Montevideo) players
Hunan Billows players
Real C.D. España players
Uruguayan expatriate sportspeople in Paraguay
Uruguayan expatriate sportspeople in Honduras
Uruguayan expatriate sportspeople in China
Expatriate footballers in Paraguay
Expatriate footballers in Honduras
Expatriate footballers in China
China League One players
Liga Nacional de Fútbol Profesional de Honduras players

Association football midfielders